Sunlight Pours Down is a 2004 South Korean television series starring Song Hye-kyo, Jo Hyun-jae, and Ryoo Seung-bum. It aired on SBS from February 11 to April 1, 2004, on Wednesdays and Thursdays at 21:55 for 16 episodes. It received an average viewership rating of 11.9%, and a peak rating of 14.4%.

Synopsis
Yeon-woo grew up happy in a loving family. After her father dies of mysterious causes, her mother remarries a man 10 years younger. Misfortunes never come singly. Her mother dies of Wilson's disease and her stepfather runs away with all their money. Min-ho, an old friend of hers, is always there to comfort her. Min-ho decides to be a policeman to catch the murderer who killed Yeon-woo's father. Eun-sup comes back to Korea with the sole purpose of stopping his lover Soo-ah from getting married, but Soo-ah gives him a flat-out rejection. To make matters worse, his father sends people over to his hotel to catch him. He runs away from the hotel and accidentally falls into the subway tracks and gets knocked unconscious. Yeon-woo leaps from the platform and saves his life. Eun-sup asks her if he could stay at her place temporarily since he has no place to go. So Yeon-woo, Min-ho and Eun-sup all started living together in a same house...

Cast

Main characters
Song Hye-kyo as Ji Yeon-woo 
Jo Hyun-jae as Jung Eun-sup 
Ryoo Seung-bum as Kim Min-ho
Choi Yoo-jung as Lee Soo-ah

Supporting characters
 Song Jae-ho as Jung Seung-beom (Eun-sup's father) 
 Kim Mi-kyung as Han Jung-do (Min-ho's mother) 
 Kim Jung-hak as Jung Sang-gook
 Kang Shin-il as Detective Nam (Min-ho's boss) 
 Oh Dae-gyu as Oh Dal-jae (Yeon-woo's stepfather) 
 Lee Young-yoo as Oh Ye-kang
 Yeo Ho-min as loan shark
 Kim Byung-choon as police officer
 Park Hyo-joo as Seung-ok
 Kim So-yeon 
 Choi Deok-moon 
 Dokko Jun 
 Kim Il-woo

References

External links
 Sunlight Pours Down official SBS website 
 
 Shining Days at KoreanWiz

2004 South Korean television series debuts
2004 South Korean television series endings
Korean-language television shows
Seoul Broadcasting System television dramas
South Korean romance television series
Television series by Kim Jong-hak Production